Lidingö SK is a sports club in Lidingö, Sweden. The men's volleyball team won the Swedish national championships 18 times between 1966 and 1981. before winning again in 1987 and 1990.

The men's junior volleyball team won the Swedish national championship for four times in a row between 1975 and 1978.

References

External links
Lidingös SK 
Lidingös SK handboll 
Lidingös SK Volleyboll 

1933 establishments in Sweden
Defunct football clubs in Sweden
Sport in Stockholm County
Sports clubs established in 1933
Swedish handball clubs
Swedish volleyball clubs
Multi-sport clubs in Sweden